The Pitztal is an alpine valley located in Tyrol, Austria. The Pitztal is a southern side valley of the Upper Inntal, and runs between the valleys Ötztal (to the east) and Kaunertal (to the west). The Pitze river runs the length of the valley and flows into the Rifflsee lake (2232 m) west of the upper coarse; its average rate of flow is 2.7 m3/s. The uppermost section of the river produces the Gries waterfall.

The primary economic activity of the valley is agriculture and tourism. One of the main attractions of the valley is the Pitztal underground funicular, which takes passengers from Mittelberg (1736 m) to Mittelbergferner mountain (3570 m). Important villages in the valley include Wenns (962 m), Sankt Leonhard im Pitztal (1366 m), and Arzl im Pitztal (880 m).

References

External links

 Pitztal official website

Valleys of Tyrol (state)